The Rassemblement pour l'Indépendance Nationale (RIN, in English: Rally for National Independence) was a political organization dedicated to the promotion of Quebec national independence from Canada.

History

It was founded on September 10, 1960,  by about 30 people at the very beginning of the  Quiet Revolution. The founders included many of former Alliance Laurentienne members. (The Alliance Laurentienne was dissolved after the creation of the RIN.) The founding members included André D'Allemagne, Jacques Bellemare and Marcel Chaput. Other prominent members included Andrée Ferretti, Hubert Aquin and Raymond Villeneuve. D'Allemagne, having participated in the Alliance Laurentienne, said that he had found the Alliance's right-wing tendencies quite unpleasant. This was a factor leading to the creation of an officially neutral organisation. However, as the RIN attracted many new young members it quickly became associated with more radical left-wing ideas.

In October 1960, the first general assembly of the organization published its manifesto calling for the independence of Quebec. Pierre Bourgault, who had joined shortly after foundation, became its president in 1964. Following the wish of the members as expressed in a resolution in 1963, the RIN was turned into a political party. Bourgault and his impassioned, fiery speeches contributed largely to the popularity of the RIN, and is often wrongly believed to be the founder of the movement.

In 1963, Georges Schoeters, Raymond Villeneuve and Gabriel Hudon, ex-members of the RIN youth wing left the party to form the underground, revolutionary Front de Libération du Québec.

In the 1966 Quebec general election, the RIN, along with the Ralliement National (RN) won about 8.8% of the popular vote and no seats. Bourgault lost the northern Duplessis riding by a very small margin, a great accomplishment for such a third party. Although it never gathered a high number of votes Quebec-wide, it played an important role in the birth of the modern "indépendantiste" movement in Quebec and was very active in public demonstrations. Famous protests of the RIN include a 1964 demonstration disapproving the visit of Queen Elizabeth II to Quebec, and a 1968 protest about the presence of Pierre Trudeau on Saint-Jean-Baptiste Day that turned to riot. Their members and supporters were also present in the Montreal crowd and their symbols visible when French President Charles de Gaulle shouted his famed "Vive le Québec Libre" (Long live free Quebec).

In October 1967, the charismatic Quebec Liberal Party Member of the National Assembly and former cabinet minister René Lévesque left the Liberal Party when its members voted to not debate his idea of two independent but associated states (Quebec and Canada). Shortly after, the Mouvement Souveraineté-Association was founded with Lévesque as leader. The RIN quickly engaged in talks over a possible merger with the MSA. Bourgault and D'Allemagne strongly believed that the forces for Quebec independence had to unite to challenge the "old parties" (Liberals and Union Nationale).

Bourgault and Lévesque started to clash, as Lévesque had come to distrust the RIN because of its perceived rowdy behaviour.  Additional opposition to the idea of a merger came from within the RIN itself; some militants (such as Andrée Ferretti) were heart-broken at the prospect of the "end" of their party. Ultimately, however, the desire for a strong independentist force carried the day. By 1968, the MSA came to an agreement with the Ralliement National to form the Parti Québécois, deliberately excluding the RIN as an entity. The RIN was divided on its position towards the PQ. The party ended up being dissolved and some members joined Lévesque's newly created party.

Leaders 
 André D'Allemagne (1960-1961)
 Marcel Chaput (1961-1962)
 Guy Pouliot (1962-1964)
 Pierre Bourgault (1964-1968)

Publication 
The party had its own periodical, published monthly, then biweekly.

 L'Indépendance. Organe officiel du Rassemblement pour l'indépendance nationale, vol. 1, issue 1 (September 1962) - vol. 6, issue 20 (September 1968)

Election results

Notes

See also
 Politics of Quebec
 List of Quebec general elections
 List of Quebec premiers
 List of Quebec leaders of the Opposition
 National Assembly of Quebec
 Timeline of Quebec history
 Political parties in Quebec
 Quebec Sovereignism
 Secessionist movements of Canada

References

In English 
 Stein, Michael B. "Separatism", in The Canadian Encyclopedia. Historica Foundation of Canada, 2008
 "Pierre Bourgault", in The Canadian Encyclopedia. Historica Foundation of Canada, 2008
 Smart, Patricia. "Aquin, Hubert", in The Canadian Encyclopedia. Historica Foundation of Canada, 2008

In French 
  Labrecque, Jean-Claude (2002). Le RIN, Montréal: Productions Virage, 78 min. (script: Michel Martin, Jean-Claude Labrecque)
 Bruno Deshaies. "Manifeste du Rassemblement pour l'indépendance nationale", in the site Le Rond-Point des sciences humaines, 2002
 D'Allemagne, André (2000). Une idée qui somnolait : écrits sur la souveraineté du Québec depuis les origines du RIN, 1958-2000, Montréal: Comeau & Nadeau, 250 p. 
 RIN. Programme politique du Rassemblement pour l'indépendance nationale : tel qu'adopté à son congrès de mai 1965, Montréal: RIN, 75 p.
 Pelletier, Réjean (1974). Les militants du R.I.N., Ottawa : Editions de l'Université d'Ottawa, 82 p. 
 D'Allemagne, André (1974). Le R.I.N. de 1960 à 1963 : étude d'un groupe de pression au Québec, Montréal : Editions L'Etincelle, 160 p. 
 RIN. Mémoire du Rassemblement pour l'indépendance nationale au Comité parlementaire de la constitution, 1964, 45 p.
 Gauvin, Jean-François. "Rassemblement pour l'indépendance nationale", in the site L'indépendance du Québec, updated June 2, 2004
 Frappier, Bernard. "Histoire : RIN", dossier in Vigile.net
 Cliche, Mathieu. "Rassemblement pour l'indépendance nationale", im QuébecPolitique.com,updated January 4, 2007
 "Crise interne au RIN", in Les Archives de Radio-Canada. Société Radio-Canada, updated January 5, 2004
 "Dissensions au congrès du RIN", in Les Archives de Radio-Canada. Société Radio-Canada, updated April 6, 2005

External links
Unofficial English translation of the 1960 Manifesto of the RIN

Provincial political parties in Quebec
Political parties established in 1960
Political parties disestablished in 1968
Defunct secessionist organizations in Canada
Defunct political parties in Canada
Pro-independence parties
Social democratic parties in Canada
Republicanism in Canada
Quebec sovereignty movement
Quebec nationalism
1960 establishments in Quebec
1968 disestablishments in Canada